Foster is a dairying and grazing town  south-east of Melbourne on the South Gippsland Highway in Victoria, Australia. At the  Foster had an urban population of 1,164.

History
Originally called Stockyard Creek, after the stream which still flows through the centre of the town, Foster was initially just a resting place for drovers travelling from Port Albert to Western Port. This changed with the discovery of gold in the 1880s, leading to a (modest) gold rush. The post office opened on 20 February 1871 as Stockyard Creek and was renamed Foster in 1879 when the township was established. In 1870 a gold rush along Stockyard Creek resulted in the township of that name and in late 1884 following comments by the Police Magistrate from Sale (Mr William H Foster) that he couldn't hold court in a creek the town suddenly became ‘Foster’. Previously a stockyard for drovers had been established along the creek but several miles from the ultimate township. The story of Foster is in a publication available at the Foster & District Historical Society Inc. The railway was extended to Foster in 1892. When the gold ran out, Foster became a service centre of the burgeoning South Gippsland dairy industry. Today it is a thriving town that links Wilsons Promontory with the rest of Victoria.

Recent Times 
Foster has one hotel and several dining options. Because of the scenic beauty of the surrounding area and its proximity to Wilsons Promontory and mountain areas inland, Foster is a popular destination for international visitors as well as Melbourne residents. In summer, the town's temporary population can increase by as much as two and a half fold due to tourism.

The football club is the Foster Tigers which is part of the Alberton Football League.

Golfers play at the Foster Golf Club course on Reserve Road.

Foster has markets from November to April. The markets do not run from May through to October, during the Victorian winter.

The Great Southern Rail Trail links Foster to Leongatha in the west and Yarram in the east. The trail is used by horseriders, cyclists, runners and walkers.

See also
Foster railway station, Victoria

References

External links
visitmelbourne.com: Foster, Victoria

Fishing communities in Australia
Mining towns in Victoria (Australia)
Towns in Victoria (Australia)
Shire of South Gippsland